Nicolle Rochelle (born May 10, 1979), often credited professionally as Nicole Leach, is an American actress, dancer, and jazz singer, best known for her appearances on television including Shining Time Station, The Babysitters Club, and made for television movies The Vernon Johns Story starring James Earl Jones and after school special Summertime Switch.

Early life
Rochelle grew up in West Orange and Montclair, New Jersey. She attended Montclair High School, and graduated early after three years and went on to earn her Linguistic Anthropology degree from Brown University.

Career
Rochelle has appeared in several TV shows, usually under the name "Nicole Leach", including the first season of Shining Time Station with former Beatles member Ringo Starr as the granddaughter of the workshop's operator, several episodes of The Babysitters Club series, and four episodes of The Cosby Show as a friend of the youngest Huxtable child. She also had guest roles on  Nickelodeon's Clarissa Explains It All as "Olivia DuPris", Where in the World is Carmen Sandiego, Third Watch, and Law & Order.

Rochelle has performed on and off-Broadway in such shows as Dangerous Games, Fame on 42nd Street, Miracle Brothers, and a 2004 production of Limonade Tous le Jours starring Alan Alda. In 2003 she played Katherine in Shakespeare in the Park's Henry V. In 2005, she played the title role in the musical Nefertiti in Fort Lauderdale. Rochelle starred in role of the new Josephine Baker in the musical A la recherche de Josephine, produced by Jérôme Savary, in Paris and touring Europe and the US from 2006 to 2010.

Starting in 2010,  Rochelle has toured internationally with the French electro-swing group "Ginkgoa" 
, French musician/singer/songwriter Julien Brunetaud with their blues/jazz group "Nikki & Jules", and been invited to sing with bands across the world from Austria to Germany, Ukraine to Hungary, Argentina, Switzerland to the US, and is currently releasing her new artist/activist project called "Modern GEAIsha", hip-hop fusion music with a message,

Benefit
In 1995, while still in high school, Rochelle participated in a musical to benefit the fight against HIV/AIDS.

Legal issues
On April 9, 2018, Leach was arrested and charged for disorderly conduct after jumping a barrier fence during a protest at Montgomery County courthouse in Norristown, Pennsylvania for the first day of Cosby's sexual assault retrial. She was topless and her body was covered with the writing "Women’s Lives Matter" and the names of the comedian's accusers. Leach jumped over when Cosby was close to the courthouse's entrance just before 9am ET, with security apprehending her afterwards. Cosby, along with spokesperson Andrew Wyatt, was blind and had a slight reaction while Wyatt was shocked in surprise. Leach had planned to attend other trial protests that day but was recommended by authorities not to and said that her intention was to make Cosby uncomfortable and that because she used to look up to him that his actions towards others had "felt personal to me."

Filmography

References

External links

Official website

1979 births
American expatriates in France
20th-century American actresses
21st-century American actresses
African-American actresses
American film actresses
American television actresses
American stage actresses
Living people
Montclair High School (New Jersey) alumni
People from Montclair, New Jersey
Brown University alumni
American child actresses
American women's rights activists
20th-century African-American women singers
American jazz singers
American dancers
21st-century American singers
21st-century African-American women
21st-century African-American musicians